A jīvanmukta, literally meaning 'liberated while living', is a person who, in the Vedānta philosophy, has gained complete self-knowledge and self-realisation and attained kaivalya or moksha (enlightenment and liberation), thus is liberated while living and not yet died. The state is the aim of moksha in Vedānta, Yoga and other schools of Hinduism, and it is referred to as jīvanmukti (Liberation or Enlightenment).

Jīvanmuktas are also called ātma-jnāni (self-realized) because they are knowers of their true self (ātman) and the universal self, hence also called Brahma-jñāni. At the end of their lives, jīvanmuktas destroy remaining karmas and attain parāmukti (final liberation) and become parāmukta. When a jīvanmukta gives his insight to others and teaches them about his / her realisation of the true nature of the ultimate reality (Brahman) and self (Atman), taking the role of a guru to show the path of Moksha to others, then that jīvanmukta is called an avadhūta.  Some avadhūtas also achieve the title of Paramahamsa. When a rishi (seer / sage) becomes a jīvanmukta then that rishi is called Brahmarshi.

Some examples of jivanmuktas are Mahāvīra, Buddha, Adi Śhankarāchārya, Saint Dnyāneshwar, Kabīrdās, Śrī Chaitanya Mahāprabhu, Rāmakrishna Paramahansa, Ramana Maharshi, Shirdi Sai Baba, Vishwāmitra, Vedānta Deśika, Swāminārāyan, and Swami Ramdas. They realized Self (atman) i.e. God within their lifetime by traveling the path of pure Spirituality. They reached the stage of Enlightenment, Self-Realization, God-Realization, jivanmukti, Atma-jnana (all words are synonyms). They have negated the karma to zero, to reach the state of Jīvan-Mukti. After gaining enlightenment, they retained their body, to disseminate the Jnāna to masses. After leaving the body, they attained Paramukti.

Etymology
Jīvanmukta (जीवन्मुक्त) is an adjective derived from a combination of Sanskrit noun जीव jīva, "life", and the past participle of the verb मुच् (much, or IAST muc), "to liberate". Monier-Williams gives the meaning "emancipated while still alive".

Jīvanmukti (जीवन्मुक्ति:), the corresponding abstract noun means, "liberation during life, liberation before death", or "emancipation while still alive". This is the only meaning given in authoritative dictionaries of classical Sanskrit, including Monier-Williams. Other translations, not found in standard dictionaries and therefore presumably of more modern date, include "self realization", "living liberation", "enlightenment", "liberated soul", or "self liberation".

Description

The various texts and schools of Hinduism describe the jīvanmukti state of existence as one of liberation and freedom reached within one's life. Some contrast jīvanmukti with videhamukti (moksha from samsāra after death). Jīvanmukti is a state that transforms the nature, attributes and behaviors of an individual, claim these ancient texts of Hindu philosophy. For example, according to Nāradaparivrājaka Upanishad, the enlightened individual shows attributes such as:
 his consciousness of individuality has disappeared;
 he is not bothered by disrespect and endures cruel words, treats others with respect regardless of how others treat him;
 when confronted by an angry person he does not return anger, instead replies with soft and kind words;
 even if tortured, he speaks and trusts the truth;
 he does not crave for blessings or expect praise from others;
 he never injures or harms any life or being (ahimsā), he is intent in the welfare of all beings;
 he is as comfortable being alone as in the presence of others;
 he is as comfortable with a bowl, at the foot of a tree in tattered robe without help, as when he is in a mithuna (union of mendicants), grama (village) and nagara (city);
 he does not care about or wear śikhā (tuft of hair on the back of head for religious reasons), nor the holy thread across his body. To him, knowledge is śikhā, knowledge is the holy thread, knowledge alone is supreme. Outer appearances and rituals do not matter to him, only knowledge matters;
 for him there is no invocation nor dismissal of deities, no mantra nor non-mantra, no prostrations nor worship of gods, goddess or ancestors, nothing other than knowledge;
 he is humble, high-spirited, of clear and steady mind, straightforward, compassionate, patient, indifferent, courageous, speaks firmly and with sweet words.

Advaita view
Ādi Śankara explains that nothing can induce one to act who has no desire of his own to satisfy. The supreme limit of vairāgya ("non-attachment"), is the non-springing of vāsanās in respect of enjoyable objects; the non-springing of the sense of the "I" (in things which are the ānatman) is the extreme limit of bodhā ("awakening"), and the non-springing again of the modifications which have ceased is the extreme limit of Uparati ("abstinence"). The jīvanmukta gains divine and infinite knowledge and has complete self-knowledge and Self-realization, a jīvanmukta by reason of his ever being Brahman, is freed from awareness of external objects and no longer aware of any difference between the inner ātman and Brahman and between Brahman and the world, he knows the he is same as Brahman and has an ever experiencing infinite consciousness. "Vijnātabrahmatattvasya yathāpūrvam na samsrtih" – "there is no saṃsāra as before for one who has known Brahman".

There are three kinds of prārabdha karma: Ichha ("personally desired"), anichhā ("without desire") and parechhā ("due to others' desire"). For a self-realized person, a jīvanmukta, there is no ichhā-prārabdha but the two others, anichhāa and parechhā, remain, which even a jīvanmukta has to undergo. According to the Advaita school, for those of wisdom prārabdha is liquidated only by experience of its effects; sancita ("accumulated karmas") and āgami ("future karmas") are destroyed in the fire of jñāna ("knowledge").

The term parāmukti is commonly used to refer to final liberation, which occurs upon the death of the body of someone who has attained Jīvanmukti or Kaivalya during his or her lifetime. It implies the ultimate release of the soul (ātman) from saṃsāra and karma and merger of the ātman in Brahman. So when a jīvanmukta dies he becomes a paramukta. In the Hindu view, when an ordinary person dies and his physical body disintegrates, the person's unresolved karma causes his ātman to pass on to a new birth; and thus the kārmic inheritance is reborn in one of the many realms of samsāra. However, when a person attains jīvanmukti, he is liberated from kārmic rebirth. When such a person dies and his physical body disintegrates, his cycle of rebirth ends and he become one with Brahman. That person is said to have achieved parāmukti and become a parāmukta.  Thus, a jīvanmukta has a body while a parāmukta is bodyless and pure. When a jīvanmukta attains the state of nirvikalpa samādhi then he or she can become a parāmukta by his or her own will. A jīvanmukta who has attained the state of nirvikalpa samādhi, will, at an appropriate time, consciously exit from their body and attain parāmukti. This act of consciously and intentionally leaving one's body is called as mahāsamādhi.

In the śramaṇic traditions, the jīvanmukta is called an arhat in Buddhism  and arihant in Jainism.

Implication

The Advaita school holds the view that the world appearance is owing to avidyā (ignorance) that has the power to project i.e. to superimpose the unreal on the real (adhyāsa), and also the power to conceal the real resulting in the delusion of the jīva who experiences objects created by his mind and sees difference in this world, he sees difference between the ātman ("the individual self") and Brahman ("the supreme Self"). This delusion caused by ignorance is destroyed when ignorance itself is destroyed by knowledge. When all delusion is removed there remains no awareness of difference. He who sees no difference between Self and Brahman is said to be a jīvanmukta. A jīvanmukta experiences infinite knowledge, infinite power, and infinite bliss while alive and also after death i.e., after becoming parāmukta, while a videhamukta experiences these only after death.

There are four stages for becoming a jīvanmukta:

1. Sālokya – living in the same world

2. Sārūpya – having the same form

3. Sāmīpya – being close to

4. Sāyujya – merging into

STAGE 1. The first stage is called sālokya — corresponding to the waking state of consciousness (jāgratā) — the realization that the entire vast universe of billions of galaxies and universes is all pervaded by the Divine Consciousness. (Viṣṇu means That which pervades the entire universe and everything in it.) It is the undifferentiated Ocean of Being. When this stage is achieved then the person is freed from the idea that the world is separate and independent from us and that it is an ultimate source of abiding pleasure and joy.

STAGE 2. The second stage is sarūpya or sadhārmya — corresponding to the dreaming state of consciousness – realization that every being is interconnected and all "apparently" separate jīvas are embodiments of the One Divine Consciousness. When this stage is achieved then the person gets the freedom from ahaṅkāra - the notion of self-identity and the notion of difference from the other, thus being able to cultivate empathy with all and universal compassion for all beings.

STAGE 3. The third stage sāmīpya — is intimacy with the Divine — corresponding to the unconscious dreamless state of consciousness – God-realization occurs when the nature of the saguṇa īśvara is cognized and one surrenders to Him/Her. When this stage is achieved, the person is freed from all self-effort to achieve liberation, from religion and its bondage, and the relinquishes all self-imposed burdens – achieving a state of equanimity, tranquility, abiding joy and peace.

STAGE 4. The final stage sāyujya — communion with, or unification with the Absolute Godhead — corresponding to the Turīya or inconceivable and inexpressible fourth state of consciousness – a merging with the Godhead bordering on complete identity.  When this stage is achieved, then the person becomes a complete jīvanmukta and gets absolute freedom from rebirth and suffering — this is the final stage of Brahma-nirvāna.

Significance

The Advaita philosophy rests on the premise that noumenally the Absolute alone exists, Nature, Souls and God are all merged in the Absolute; the Universe is one, that there is no difference within it, or without it; Brahman is alike throughout its structure, and the knowledge of any part of it is the knowledge of the whole (Brihadarānyaka Upanishad II.4.6-14), and, since all causation is ultimately due to Brahman, since everything beside Brahman is an appearance, the Atman is the only entity that exists and nothing else. All elements emanated from the Atman (Taittirīya Upanishad II.1) and all existence is based on Intellect (Aitareya Upanishad III.3). The universe created by Brahman from a part of itself is thrown out and re-absorbed by the Immutable Brahman (Mundaka Upanishad I.1.7). Therefore, the jīva (the individual self) is non-different from Brahman (the supreme Self), and the jīva, never bound, is ever liberated. Through Self-consciousness one gains the knowledge of existence and realizes Brahman.

References

Hindu philosophical concepts